Brett McLean (born August 14, 1978) is a Canadian former professional ice hockey centre who played in the National Hockey League for the Chicago Blackhawks, Colorado Avalanche and the Florida Panthers.

Playing career
Brett McLean was selected with the sixth last pick, 242nd overall, in the 1997 NHL Entry Draft by the Dallas Stars. Despite a productive junior career with the Kelowna Rockets of the Western Hockey League, McLean was unable to earn a contract from the Stars. Unsigned, McLean toiled in the minor leagues with affiliates of the Calgary Flames and the Minnesota Wild before signing with the Chicago Blackhawks and making his NHL debut in the 2002–03 season.

In the 2003–04 season, McLean played his first full year in the NHL as he scored 11 goals with the rebuilding Blackhawks. Brett scored his first career NHL goal in his third career game on October 16, 2003, against Marc Denis and the Columbus Blue Jackets in a 2-1 Blackhawks loss. He signed as a free agent with the Colorado Avalanche on July 21, 2004.  In 2004–05, he joined the Malmö Redhawks of the Swedish Elitserien during the NHL lockout. Brett scored a career-high 40 points in 2005–06 with the Avalanche and backed up the following season with 15 even strength goals in the 2006–07 season.

On July 1, 2007, McLean signed a three-year contract with the Florida Panthers. In his first season with the Panthers in 2007–08, McLean finished 5th on the team in points with 37 in 67 games. He failed to reproduce the same form in the 2008–09 season as his points total dipped to 19. Following the Panthers failure to reach the playoffs, McLean was bought out from the remaining year of his contract on June 29, 2009.

On September 9, 2009, McLean was invited to the Tampa Bay Lightning training camp for the 2009–10 season. McLean was among the final cuts before the season began and was released. On October 10, 2009, McLean signed a one-year contract with SC Bern, in Swiss National League, where he spent the next two years. A.

On July 1, 2011, after two years spent in Europe, McLean signed a two-way contract with the Chicago Blackhawks. Unable to stick with the Blackhawks out of training camp, McLean was assigned to affiliate, the Rockford IceHogs of the AHL. Upon reaching the midpoint of the 2011–12 season without a recall, McLean sought a release and returned to the Swiss NLA, signing and later extending for a further season with HC Lugano on March 15, 2012.

On June 3, 2015, McLean left the NLA after six seasons and signed a one-year contract with Austrian club, EHC Black Wings Linz of the EBEL. After two productive seasons with Linz, at after completing his 18th full professional season in 2016–17, McLean opted to end his professional career and return home to Canada on March 22, 2017.

Career statistics

Regular season and playoffs

International

Awards and honours

References

External links

1978 births
Brandon Wheat Kings players
Canadian expatriate ice hockey players in Sweden
Canadian ice hockey centres
Canadian people of Scottish descent
Chicago Blackhawks players
Colorado Avalanche players
Dallas Stars draft picks
EHC Black Wings Linz players
Florida Panthers players
HC Lugano players
Ice hockey people from British Columbia
Johnstown Chiefs players
Kelowna Rockets players
Living people
Malmö Redhawks players
People from Comox, British Columbia
Rockford IceHogs (AHL) players
SC Bern players
Tacoma Rockets players
20th-century Canadian people
21st-century Canadian people